Phosphatidylinositol binding clathrin assembly protein, also known as PICALM, is a protein which in humans is encoded by the PICALM gene.

Interactions 
PICALM has been shown to interact with CLTC.

Clinical significance 

In humans, certain alleles of this gene have been statistically associated with an increased risk of developing late-onset Alzheimer's disease.

References

Further reading